The 1940 Sewanee Tigers football team was an American football team that represented Sewanee: The University of the South as a member of the Southeastern Conference during the 1940 college football season. In their first season under head coach Jenks Gillem, Sewanee compiled a 3–5 record.

Schedule

References

Sewanee
Sewanee Tigers football seasons
Sewanee Tigers football